Carabus forreri is a species of ground beetle in the family Carabidae. It is found in Central America and North America.

Subspecies
These two subspecies belong to the species Carabus forreri:
 Carabus forreri forreri Bates, 1882
 Carabus forreri willi Deuve, 2003

References

Further reading

 

forreri
Articles created by Qbugbot
Beetles described in 1882